The 1932 Stanford Indians football team was an American football team that represented Stanford University in the Pacific Coast Conference (PCC) during the 1932 college football season. In its ninth and final season under head coach Pop Warner, the team compiled a 6–4–1 record (1–3–1 against conference opponents), finished in seventh place in the PCC, and outscored opponents by a total of 171 to 58.

Following the season, Warner left Stanford to become the head coach at Temple.

Schedule

Game summaries

California
The 1932 Big Game is the only game in the series to have ended in a scoreless tie.

References

Stanford
Stanford Cardinal football seasons
Stanford Indians football